Kgopedi Oa Namane Lilokoe is a South African radio personality from Tembisa. She is the former Midday News and Africa Watch anchor on South Africa’s largest commercial radio station, Metro FM. She also hosted Africa Digest, a daily current affairs programme that runs from 5pm to 8pm, on Channel Africa Radio. In June 2016, she was announced as a host of the 12th Africa Movie Academy Awards.

References

South African radio presenters
South African women radio presenters
South African women journalists
Women radio journalists
Living people
Year of birth missing (living people)